The 2016 Wichita Falls Nighthawks season was the second season for the professional indoor football franchise and second in the Indoor Football League (IFL). One of ten teams that competed in the IFL for the 2016 season, the Nighthawks were members of the United Conference.

Led by head coach Billy Back, the Nighthawks played their home games at the Kay Yeager Coliseum in Wichita Falls, Texas.

Schedule
Key:

Pre-season

Regular season
All start times are local time

Standings

Postseason

Roster

References

Wichita Falls Nighthawks
Wichita Falls Nighthawks
Wichita Falls Nighthawks